Karen Taylor may refer to:

 Karen Taylor (comedian) (born 1976), English comedian
 Karen Taylor (EastEnders), fictional character in the British soap opera EastEnders
 Karen Taylor (Hollyoaks), fictional character in the British soap opera Hollyoaks
 Karen Taylor (The Young and the Restless), fictional character in the American soap opera The Young and the Restless
 Karen E. Taylor, American horror and fantasy writer
 Karen T. Taylor (born 1952), American forensic artist
 Karen Taylor, basketball player and mother of basketball player Stanley Johnson
Karrin Taylor Robson, Arizona politician